Four Jills in a Jeep is a 1944 American comedy-drama musical film starring Kay Francis, Carole Landis, Martha Raye, and Mitzi Mayfair as themselves, re-enacting their USO tour of Europe and North Africa during World War II.

Production
The working titles of this film were Command Performance and Camp Show. Before the film's opening credits, an onscreen written prologue reads, "This story is based on the experiences of four of the many performers who take entertainment to America's men in uniform in the theatres of war as well as in the camps at home. Actors who serve in this global entertainment program consider it a privilege to lighten a little the hardships endured by our fighting men and to share, in a measure, their experiences in combat zones. The producers gratefully acknowledge the work of USO-Camp Shows, Inc., the Hollywood Victory Committee and the Special Service Division of the War Department." As noted in the onscreen credits, the picture was based on the actual experiences of Kay Francis, Carole Landis, Martha Raye and Mitzi Mayfair, who, as the members of the Feminine Theatrical Task Force, entertained American and British troops on a tour of England, Ireland, and North Africa. The women left the United States on 16 October 1942 and spent approximately three months in England, Ireland, Scotland, and Wales. During their sometimes difficult tour, the women performed several shows a day for the troops. They also presented a command performance for the Queen of the United Kingdom.

After leaving England, the women spent approximately three weeks in North Africa, which marked the first USO tour of that area. Francis and Mayfair then returned to the United States. Landis flew back to England to join her husband. As depicted in the film, Landis met U.S. Army Air Forces pilot Capt. Thomas C. Wallace in England in November 1942 and married him on 5 January 1943. The couple divorced in July 1945.

Raye, who was "the first honorary captain created in World War II," according to a LAEx article, continued touring with other USO groups. The experience marked the beginning of Raye's long association with the USO, and her many visits to the troops during the Korean and Vietnam wars, as well as her service as a nurse, earned Raye many awards, including a Silver Star, a Purple Heart, the USO's Distinguished Service Award, and the Presidential Medal of Freedom. (In 1994, Raye attempted to sue actress Bette Midler and the producers of the 1991 picture For the Boys, which told the story of a USO entertainer. Although Raye claimed that the 1991 picture was plagiarized from an autobiographical outline she had written, her case was dismissed.)

According to information in the Twentieth Century-Fox Records of the Legal Department, Landis and Edwin Seaver wrote a book about her travels while the film was in pre-production at the studio. Although UCLA Arts—Special Collections Library, Landis's material was not used in the screenplay, the studio agreed to let her use the film's title as her book title for the publicity value. Her book, which was published in 1944, first appeared as a serial in The Saturday Evening Post (18 December 1943 – 15 January 1944). The legal records indicate that, while the film was based on the experiences of all four performers, only Mayfair and Francis directly contributed to the screenplay. The legal records also indicate that Mayfair's agent, Lou Irwin, was the first person to suggest the idea of the film to the studio. Studio records reveal that Waldo Salt worked on an early draft of the film's script, but the extent of his contribution to the completed picture has not been determined.

According to a The Hollywood Reporter news item, Islin Auster was originally scheduled to produce the picture. The Twentieth Century-Fox Produced Scripts Collection, also kept at UCLA, contains conference notes with studio production chief Darryl F. Zanuck, who planned for John Sutton to play "Capt. Lloyd." Zanuck told director William A. Seiter, "Martha Raye usually talks too fast and too loud. Try to make her play Martha-Raye-off-stage and not Martha-Raye-on-the-screen, if possible." An August 1943 HR news item noted that Jack Oakie had been set for the comedy lead and that Cornel Wilde was being considered for "the juvenile spot." Although a 21 October 1943 HR news item stated that Raye would sing "Jeep, Jeep, Listen to the Soldiers Sing," which she had written herself, the song does not appear in the completed picture. This marked the screen debut of singer Dick Haymes. Dance director Don Loper was borrowed from MGM for the production, which was Francis's first film appearance since the 1942 Universal production Between Us Girls. Mayfair had not appeared in a feature film since the 1930 musical Paramount on Parade, and Four Jills in a Jeep was her last screen appearance.

According to an April 1943 HR news item, Landis, Raye, and Mayfair were also scheduled to make a short film recreating their act. Twentieth Century-Fox loaned Harold Schuster to the Army to direct the short, which was "to be exhibited only before Army groups, and is not for public showing." According to the news item, "The short opens on the set of [Four Jills in a Jeep], from which point the girls go into their act."

Cast
 Kay Francis as herself
 Carole Landis as herself
 Martha Raye as herself
 Mitzi Mayfair as herself
 Jimmy Dorsey and His Orchestra as Themselves
 John Harvey as Ted Warren
 Phil Silvers as Eddie
 Dick Haymes as Lt. Dick Ryan
 Alice Faye as herself
 Betty Grable as herself
 Carmen Miranda as herself
 George Jessel as himself

Reception
The New York Times reviewer Bosley Crowther was unimpressed, writing, "It gives the painful impression of having been tossed together in a couple of hours. All that happens, really, is a lot of dizzying about the dames and some singing and dancing by them in an undistinguished style."

See also
List of American films of 1944

References

External links

1944 films
1944 musical films
American black-and-white films
Films directed by William A. Seiter
World War II films made in wartime
20th Century Fox films
American musical films
Films scored by Arthur Lange